Zebleys Corner is an unincorporated community located in Bethel Township in Delaware County, Pennsylvania, United States. Zebleys Corner is located at the intersection of Pennsylvania Route 261 and Zebley Road a short distance north of the Delaware border.

References

Unincorporated communities in Delaware County, Pennsylvania
Unincorporated communities in Pennsylvania